Er Wang Dong is a large cave in the Wulong Karst region, in Wulong County of Chongqing Municipality of China.

It is large enough to contain its own weather system.

Er Wang Dong cave has formed in Lower Ordovician limestone and is located close to another very large cave system - San Wang Dong.

Both caves were explored by Hong Meigui Cave Exploration Society. Local people make weather forecasts based on the observations in Niubizi tiankeng - if there is a fog coming from the cave, rain is expected.

See also

 
 
 List of caves in China

References

Caves of Chongqing
Karst caves
Karst formations of China